Bilytske is a city in Dobropillia municipality, Donetsk Oblast (province) of Ukraine. Population: .

History 
During the Second World War, from November 1941 to 1943, the settlement was occupied by Axis troops.

In December 1966, the urban-type settlement became a city.

In 1980s the basis of the economy was coal mining. In January 1989, the population of the city was 11.6 thousand people

In January 2013 the population was 8,691 people.

Demographics
Native language as of the Ukrainian Census of 2001:
Ukrainian  93.7%
Russian  5.7%
Belarusian  0.3%

References

Cities in Donetsk Oblast
Cities of district significance in Ukraine
Populated places established in the Russian Empire
Pokrovsk Raion